The superficial cerebral veins are a group of cerebral veins in the head.

This group includes the superior cerebral veins, the superficial middle cerebral vein, the inferior cerebral veins, the inferior anastomotic vein and the superior anastomotic vein.

References

Veins of the head and neck